My Kantele is an EP / compilation album by Finnish metal band Amorphis, released in 1997. It is not to be confused with the song "My Kantele" from the album Elegy, which is not on this compilation, although the title is still used as it contains the acoustic version of "My Kantele" and four previously unreleased songs. The song "My Kantele" is a traditional Finnish song from the 1840 collection Kanteletar, sung by Loituma.

Track listing

Personnel

Amorphis 
Pasi Koskinen – vocals
Esa Holopainen – lead guitar; electric sitar on track 1
Tomi Koivusaari – rhythm guitar
Olli-Pekka Laine – bass
Kim Rantala – keyboards; accordion on track 1
Pekka Kasari – drums

Additional personnel 
Mamba – additional percussion on track 3
Pete "Pee Wee" Coleman – mixing
Dave Shirk – mastering
William J. Yurkiewicz Jr. – mastering
Adam Peterson – design
Kai "Hiili" Hiilesmaa – engineering
Dave Brock – songwriting on "Levitation"

References 

Amorphis albums
1997 albums